The United Nations Association of the National Capital Area (UNA-NCA) is a non-profit membership organization based in Washington, DC. It is dedicated to building an understanding of and support for the ideals and vital work of the United Nations among the American people. It is dedicated to educating, inspiring, and mobilizing Americans to support the principles and work of the United Nations. It also strengthens the United Nations system, promotes constructive United States leadership in the system, and achieves the goals of the United Nations Charter

History
The United Nations Association of the National Capital Area (UNA-NCA) was established in 1952. It is one of the oldest and largest divisions of the United Nations Association of the USA (UNA-USA).  It is also a member of the World Federation of United Nations Associations (WFUNA). 
Over 2,000 members, volunteers, and supporters contribute to the organization. The UNA-NCA works to build public knowledge, strengthen UN-US relations, and aid the UN in achieving its goals.

External links 
 Official site

References 

 
 
 

World Federation of United Nations Associations
United States and the United Nations
Organizations based in Washington, D.C.